Alexandros Karachalios (born 20 October 1985) is a Greek footballer who plays for Olympiakos Agiou Stefanou as a right winger.

Career
Born in Athens, Karachalios began his playing career with Panionios and has played in the Greek Super League for Panionios and Akratitos.

References

External links
 
 Myplayer Profile
 Profile at Onsports.gr

1985 births
Living people
Panionios F.C. players
A.P.O. Akratitos Ano Liosia players
Kavala F.C. players
Kallithea F.C. players
Aias Salamina F.C. players
Athlitiki Enosi Larissa F.C. players
Diagoras F.C. players
Apollon Smyrnis F.C. players
Paniliakos F.C. players
Kalamata F.C. players
A.O. Nea Ionia F.C. players
Ionikos F.C. players
Association football wingers
Footballers from Athens
Greek footballers